The Peel Session is an EP by Icelandic band múm that was released in 2006. The songs were recorded at Maida Vale Studios for the band's Peel Session, first broadcast on 3 October 2002.

Track listing
 "Scratched Bicycle/Smell Memory" — 5:25
 "Awake on a Train" — 7:58
 "Now There Is That Fear Again" — 3:57
 "The Ballad of the Broken String" — 3:56

References

2006 EPs
Mum
FatCat Records albums
Múm albums
Live EPs
2006 live albums